Kalippu is a 2019 Indian Malayalam-language action thriller film written and directed by Jessen Joseph. Film Film producer under the banner of High Mastcinemas. The film features Tamil film actor Bala Singh, Kalasala Babu, Shalil Kallur, Ambika Mohan, Jeffin and Anaz Sainudeen.

Plot
Kalippu is a film bound with the stories of 2 groups in choola colony. The film is about a group of youngsters who act for the common people who were denied of justice. This film moves through all the injustice that is happening in our society.

Cast

Music
The film score is composed by Amarnath and Anaz Sainudeen. The song "Vidaran Kothikkum Matrayil" was composed by AmarNath. The other two songs, "Chembazhak" and "Manushya Nee", were thus composed by GAnaz sainudeen.

Track listing

Release 
Kalippu was released in India on 10 May 2019. The film had a digital release through Amazon Prime Video.

Critical reception
The Times of India rated 1.5 out of 5 and wrote it "Kalippu is a poorly made movie that masquerades as a social drama with numerous messages".

References

External links

2010s Malayalam-language films
2019 action thriller films
Indian action thriller films